Aromaa is a Finnish surname. Notable people with the surname include:

 Emanuel Aromaa (1873–1933), Finnish shoemaker and politician
 Vihtori Aromaa (1872–1932), Finnish bricklayer and politician

Finnish-language surnames